Series 8 of the ITV programme Foyle's War, comprising three episodes, aired in January 2015 on ITV. Though most episodes were broadcast at 8 pm on ITV, the final one was transmitted at 9 pm.

Episodes

"High Castle"

Cast and characters
Adam Wainwright is forced, on two fronts, to address the issue of women who went to work during wartime and who do not want to give up their jobs postwar. One of his constituents doesn't want to be demoted in order to accommodate a returning soldier whose job she had filled competently in the soldier's absence. Meanwhile, at home, the Wainwrights struggle over his desire for her to quit her job to become a stay-at-home mother. While Foyle investigates the deaths of Knowles and Linz, Sam Wainwright decides to volunteer for a risky undercover job to find a "Friends of Himmler" photograph (removed by Knowles from the university archive) that incriminates Del Mar’s father by revealing his connection with the Nazis during the war. Foyle, unaware that Sam is pregnant, agrees. Foyle also seems to strike up a mutual intellectual appreciation with Dr. Elizabeth Addis, a colleague of Knowles at UCL.

Background and production
The story is set shortly after the Nuremberg trials, which ended on 1 October 1946. Linz and others like him had been put on trial because during WWII his firm, IG Farben, had hired Monowitz Concentration Camp inmates from the SS as cheap laborers, which was a form of war profiteering. Del Mar and his father, who own Global American Oil, are revealed to have also been war profiteers who should have been tried during the Nuremberg trials, as Linz was (and as Strasser was in the previous episode). However, MI5 had a history of looking the other way and protecting influential people like Del Mar: in his case, the British government was counting on him using his influence to help the UK build a business relationship with the Shah of Iran to help the UK compete successfully against the Soviet Union for favorable oil deals in the Middle East.

"Trespass"

Cast and characters
Adam Wainwright continues serving as an MP, while Sam Wainwright continues helping Foyle with his work. She also takes interest in a local boy suffering from whooping cough. Foyle briefly resigns after being set up while trying to meet members of an Arab delegation, and it is revealed at the end of the episode that Addis is working for Pierce.

Background and production
The episode opens with newsreel coverage of the King David Hotel bombing in Jerusalem on 22 July 1946, which acts as a background to later tensions over the Palestine issue in London. References are also made to graffiti depicted symbolising Perish Judah ("PJ"), and a Right Club type of organisation which agitates Londoners in Adam Wainwright's electoral district. The show also references the early stages of the formation of the NHS.

"Elise"

Cast and characters
A major subplot in the show is that of racketeer Damian White, a man who has become wealthy from illegal clubs, bars, dealings in black market goods, and more recently, the sale of state secrets to Russia. Sam Wainwright is faced with a dilemma when her husband Adam is persuaded to crack down on the black market but is arrested when contraband cigarettes are planted in their home. Defending his innocence, she discovers the collusion of police Chief Superintendent Usborne of East Peckham with White. At great risk, she convinces Harris, her husband’s secretary, to accompanying her when she follows Usborne to get evidence of his collusion. Photographing them together, she gets them both convicted - White for treason; Usborne for receiving stolen goods - through providing the photos to Foyle. Consequently, her husband is cleared. The series ends with Sam finally telling Foyle she is pregnant - technically PWP (pregnant without permission) as they subtly joke, flagging the gender discrimination at the time - and her touchingly asking him to be the baby’s godfather.

Background and production
According to letters found in Pierce's apartment, the story takes place a few days after 3 January 1947. Real events which influenced this episode include Operation NordPol, a successful German intelligence operation in Holland in 1942 and 1943. Other ongoing themes include the post-war black marketing in food and other goods, meat substitutions, as well as building material shortages. One scene refers to entertainment at the time, showing a "Happy and Glorious" film poster, starring pre- and post-war, stage, screen and radio comedian Tommy Trinder.

International broadcast
“Elise” was broadcast in the United States as Foyle's War VIII, on PBS' Masterpiece and on Acorn TV.

References

External links
 Series 8 on IMDb

Fiction set in 1946
Foyle's War episodes
2015 British television seasons